The Mana dynasty was a dynasty who ruled the present-day area of the Chandrapur district for about 200 years before being overthrown by Kol Bhil, leader of the Gonds. They ruled from the fort of Wairagarh.

History
The Mana dynasty began somewhere about 650 CE, achieving supremacy over the petty chiefs

Major Lucie Smith mentions the local tradition of the line of Mana kings who ruled at Wairagarh, and were subdued by the Gonds. The Mana princes whose names he recorded were Kurumpruhoda, the first of the line, who ruled in Wairagarh. He fortified Wairagarh along with Garbori and Rajoli. Surjat Badwaik was another ruler who fortified Surjagarh, and King Gahilu built the fortress of Manikgarh, named after the patron goddess of his dynasty- Manikyadevi.

Decline
Kol Bhill, a local leader of the Gondi people, led the Gonds against the Mana chiefs of Wairagarh, who had dominated the region for about 200 years. After years of warfare the Manas fell to the Gonds, who replaced them.

References

History of Maharashtra
Dynasties of India